The 1995 Clemson Tigers football team represented Clemson University during the 1995 NCAA Division I-A football season.

Schedule

References

Clemson
Clemson Tigers football seasons
Clemson Tigers football